In science and engineering the study of high pressure examines its effects on materials and the design and construction of devices, such as a diamond anvil cell, which can create high pressure. By high pressure is usually meant pressures of thousands (kilobars) or millions (megabars) of times atmospheric pressure (about 1 bar or 100,000 Pa).

History and overview
Percy Williams Bridgman received a Nobel Prize in 1946 for advancing this area of physics by several magnitudes of pressure (400 MPa to 40,000 MPa). The list of founding fathers of this field includes also the names of Harry George Drickamer, Tracy Hall, Francis P. Bundy, Leonid F. Vereschagin, and Sergey M. Stishov.

It was by applying high pressure as well as high temperature to carbon that man-made diamonds were first produced as well as many other interesting discoveries. Almost any material when subjected to high pressure will compact itself into a denser form, for example, quartz, also called silica or silicon dioxide will first adopt a denser form known as coesite, then upon application of even higher pressure, form stishovite. These two forms of silica were first discovered by high-pressure experimenters, but then found in nature at the site of a meteor impact.

Chemical bonding is likely to change under high pressure, when the P*V term in the free energy becomes comparable to the energies of typical chemical bonds – i.e. at around 100 GPa. Among the most striking changes are metallization of oxygen at 96 GPa (rendering oxygen a superconductor), and transition of sodium from a nearly-free-electron metal to a transparent insulator at ~200 GPa. At ultimately high compression, however, all materials will metallize.

High-pressure experimentation has led to the discovery of the types of minerals which are believed to exist in the deep mantle of the Earth, such as silicate perovskite, which is thought to make up half of the Earth's bulk, and post-perovskite, which occurs at the core-mantle boundary and explains many anomalies inferred for that region.

Pressure "landmarks": typical pressures reached by large-volume presses are up to 30–40 GPa, pressures that can be generated inside diamond anvil cells are ~1000 GPa, pressure in the center of the Earth is 364 GPa, and highest pressures ever achieved in shock waves are over 100,000 GPa.

See also
 Synthetic diamond
 D-DIA

References

Further reading

Materials science
Pressure